Typhinellus constrictus is a species of sea snail, a marine gastropod mollusk, in the family Muricidae, the murex snails or rock snails.

Distribution
This species occurs in Madagascar.

References

External links
  Houart R. & Héros V. (2015). New species of Muricidae Rafinesque, 1815 (Mollusca: Gastropoda) from the Western Indian Ocean. Zoosystema. 37(3): 481-503.

constrictus
Gastropods described in 2015